In mathematics, and more particularly in number theory, primorial, denoted by "#", is a function from natural numbers to natural numbers similar to the factorial function, but rather than successively multiplying positive integers, the function only multiplies prime numbers.

The name "primorial", coined by Harvey Dubner, draws an analogy to primes similar to the way the name "factorial" relates to factors.

Definition for prime numbers 

For the th prime number , the primorial  is defined as the product of the first  primes:

,

where  is the th prime number. For instance,  signifies the product of the first 5 primes:

The first five primorials  are:

2, 6, 30, 210, 2310 .

The sequence also includes  as empty product. Asymptotically, primorials  grow according to:

where  is Little O notation.

Definition for natural numbers 

,

where  is the prime-counting function , which gives the number of primes ≤ . This is equivalent to:

For example, 12# represents the product of those primes ≤ 12:

Since , this can be calculated as:

Consider the first 12 values of :

1, 2, 6, 6, 30, 30, 210, 210, 210, 210, 2310, 2310.

We see that for composite  every term  simply duplicates the preceding term , as given in the definition. In the above example we have  since 12 is a composite number.

Primorials are related to the first Chebyshev function, written  according to:

The idea of multiplying all known primes occurs in some proofs of the infinitude of the prime numbers, where it is used to derive the existence of another prime.

Characteristics 

 Let  and  be two adjacent prime numbers. Given any , where :

 For the Primorial, the following approximation is known:
.

Notes:

 Using elementary methods, mathematician Denis Hanson showed that 
 Using more advanced methods, Rosser and Schoenfeld  showed that 

 Furthermore:

 Let  be the -th prime, then  has exactly  divisors. For example,  has 2 divisors,  has 4 divisors,  has 8 divisors and  already has  divisors, as 97 is the 25th prime.
 The sum of the reciprocal values of the primorial converges towards a constant

The Engel expansion of this number results in the sequence of the prime numbers (See )

According to Euclid's theorem,  is used to prove the infinitude of the prime numbers.

Applications and properties 
Primorials play a role in the search for prime numbers in additive arithmetic progressions. For instance, 

Every highly composite number is a product of primorials (e.g. 360 = ).

Primorials are all square-free integers, and each one has more distinct prime factors than any number smaller than it. For each primorial , the fraction  is smaller than for any lesser integer, where  is the Euler totient function.

Any completely multiplicative function is defined by its values at primorials, since it is defined by its values at primes, which can be recovered by division of adjacent values.

Base systems corresponding to primorials (such as base 30, not to be confused with the primorial number system) have a lower proportion of repeating fractions than any smaller base.

Every primorial is a sparsely totient number.

The -compositorial of a composite number  is the product of all composite numbers up to and including . The -compositorial is equal to the -factorial divided by the primorial . The compositorials are
1, 4, 24, 192, 1728, ...

Appearance 

The Riemann zeta function at positive integers greater than one can be expressed by using the primorial function and Jordan's totient function :

Table of primorials

See also 
 Bonse's inequality
 Chebyshev function
 Primorial number system
 Primorial prime

Notes

References 
 
Spencer, Adam "Top 100" Number 59 part 4.

Integer sequences
Factorial and binomial topics
Prime numbers